Past and Present may refer to:

 Past and Present (book), by Thomas Carlyle, 1843
 Past & Present (journal), a British academic journal 
 Past and Present (paintings), series of three paintings by Augustus Egg, 1858 
 Past and Present (film), a 1972 Portuguese film 
 "Past and Present" (Stargate SG-1), an episode of the TV series
 "Past and Present", an episode of TV series Dark
 Past & Present, a 2010 album by the Carter Family III

See also
 Yesterday and Today (disambiguation)
 Then and Now (disambiguation)
 PAST (disambiguation)
 Present (disambiguation)